The Cipó canastero (Asthenes luizae) is a bird endemic to the Brazilian interior. It was discovered in 1985.

References

External links
 BirdLife Species Factsheet.
 A page about the bird

Cipó canastero
Endemic birds of Brazil
Cipó canastero